Seth Tymere Roberts (born February 22, 1991) is a former American football wide receiver. He played college football at West Alabama, and signed with the Oakland Raiders as an undrafted free agent in 2014.

College career
Roberts played junior college football at Pearl River Community College in Poplarville, Mississippi. Roberts later transferred to the University of West Alabama in 2012. As a junior, he caught 22 passes for 312 yards and a touchdown. As a senior in 2013, he had 38 catches for 799 yards and 11 touchdowns, earning All-Conference honors.

Professional career

Oakland Raiders
Roberts was signed by the Oakland Raiders as an undrafted free agent in 2014. On August 30, 2014, Roberts was waived by the Raiders and was signed to the practice squad the next day. After spending his entire rookie year on the practice squad, he signed a reserve/future contract with the Raiders.

Roberts made the Raiders' final roster in 2015. He played in all 16 games with five starts, recording 32 catches for 480 yards and five touchdowns. In the 2016 season, Roberts played in all 16 games with six starts, recording 38 catches for 397 yards and five touchdowns. On August 30, 2017, Roberts signed a two-year contract extension with the Raiders through 2019. On September 10, 2017, against the Tennessee Titans in the season opener, Roberts had only one target, but he was able to record his first and only touchdown of the season as the Raiders won 26–16. On April 4, 2019, the Raiders released Roberts.

Baltimore Ravens
Roberts signed with the Baltimore Ravens on April 5, 2019. In his only year with the team, Roberts finished with 21 receptions with 271 yards and 2 touchdowns.

Carolina Panthers
On March 26, 2020, Roberts signed with the Carolina Panthers. He was released by the Panthers on October 26, 2020.

Green Bay Packers
On October 31, 2020, Roberts was signed to the Green Bay Packers practice squad. His practice squad contract with the team expired after the season on February 1, 2021.

NFL career statistics

Regular season

Postseason

References

1991 births
Living people
People from Moultrie, Georgia
Players of American football from Georgia (U.S. state)
Pearl River Wildcats football players
American football wide receivers
West Alabama Tigers football players
Oakland Raiders players
Baltimore Ravens players
Carolina Panthers players
Green Bay Packers players